Sandbach services is a motorway service station on the M6 in Sandbach, Cheshire, England.

History 
The services originally opened in 1976 and have always been operated by Roadchef. National Express use it for the drivers' 45 minute breaks.

In 2004, Swiss catering inspectors, working on behalf of the AA and Continental motoring organisations, found that Sandbach Services were the worst of the 61 service stations they had visited. In August 2011, it was rated as three stars by quality assessors at Visit England.

The arrests of two men in connection with the failed Glasgow bombing were conducted in the vicinity of Sandbach Services because it is relatively isolated services, as opposed to the next set of services at Stoke, on the junction with the A500. They are also the last services on the M6 in Cheshire and therefore the final place for the Cheshire Constabulary to act.

Location
The services are located between junctions 16 and 17 of the M6 on both sides of the carriageway. The nearest town is Sandbach. Nearby attractions include Jodrell Bank Observatory.

References

External links
 Motorway Services Online - Sandbach

M6 motorway service stations
RoadChef motorway service stations
Sandbach